Which may refer to:

 a relative pronoun
 an interrogative word
which (command), an operating system command
Which?, a UK charity and its magazine

See also 
 English relative clauses
 Interrogative clause
 Whicher (disambiguation)